Morgan Klimchuk (born March 2, 1995) is a Canadian former professional ice hockey winger who played with the Calgary Flames in the National Hockey League (NHL). Klimchuk was selected in the first round, 28th overall, at the 2013 NHL Entry Draft by the Flames.

Playing career
Born in Regina, Saskatchewan in family with Ukrainian roots, Klimchuk grew up in Calgary, Alberta, and played his minor hockey in the Calgary Buffaloes system. He was the captain of his team in the Alberta Major Bantam Hockey League in 2009–10 and led his squad to the final of the Western Canadian Bantam championship, ultimately settling for second place. The Western Hockey League (WHL)'s Regina Pats selected him in the first round, fifth overall, at the 2010 WHL Bantam Draft, and he appeared in five games with the Pats in 2010–11. Klimchuk joined the Pats full-time in 2011–12. He played in 67 games, and his 36 points helped Regina reach the WHL playoffs for the first time since 2008. He was a member of Team Pacific at the 2012 World U-17 Hockey Challenge, finishing second in team scoring with six points in six games, and played with Team Alberta at the 2011 Canada Winter Games. 

In his second WHL season, 2012–13, Klimchuk improved to 76 points and finished second in team scoring. He made two appearances with the Canadian national under-18 team. He was a member of the gold medal-winning Canadian team at the 2012 Ivan Hlinka Memorial Tournament. Playing on the top line with Sam Reinhart and Connor McDavid, Klimchuk scored eight points to help lead Canada to a gold medal at the 2013 IIHF World U18 Championships.

Playing all roles in Regina, Klimchuk developed into a top prospect for the 2013 NHL Entry Draft and was ranked by the NHL Central Scouting Bureau 25th among North American skaters. He credited the chance to play in all offensive and defensive situations with helping him develop a strong two-way game. The Calgary Flames used the pick they acquired in the Jarome Iginla trade to select Klimchuk in the first round, 28th overall. He signed a three-year entry-level contract with the Flames on December 17, 2013.

On January 2, 2015, Klimchuk was dealt from the Pats to the Brandon Wheat Kings, in a trade that saw Jesse Gabrielle move to the Pats.

Klimchuk was invited to the Flames' 2015 training camp, but was assigned to the Flames AHL affiliate, the Stockton Heat for the 2015–16 season. Klimchuk made his NHL debut on February 19, 2018, against the Boston Bruins. The following day he was reassigned to the AHL.

During the 2018–19 season, on November 27, 2018, Klimchuk was traded by the Flames to the Toronto Maple Leafs in exchange for Andrew Nielsen. Klimchuk appeared in just 13 games with the Toronto Marlies, before he was traded by the Maple Leafs for the second time within the season to the Ottawa Senators in exchange for Gabriel Gagne on January 11, 2019.

Career statistics

Regular season and playoffs

International

Awards and honours

References

External links
 

1995 births
Living people
Abbotsford Heat players
Belleville Senators players
Brandon Wheat Kings players
Calgary Flames draft picks
Calgary Flames players
Canadian expatriate ice hockey players in the United States
Canadian ice hockey left wingers
Canadian people of Ukrainian descent
Ice hockey people from Saskatchewan
National Hockey League first-round draft picks
Regina Pats players
Ice hockey people from Calgary
Sportspeople from Regina, Saskatchewan
Stockton Heat players
Toronto Marlies players